Bowj (also Romanized as Būj; also known as Borj, Bowi, and Būzh) is a village in Ekhtiarabad Rural District, in the Central District of Kerman County, Kerman Province, Iran. At the 2006 census, its population was 132, in 32 families.

References 

Populated places in Kerman County